Acokanthera is a genus of flowering plants in the family Apocynaceae. It comprises 5 species and is generally restricted to Africa, although Acokanthera schimperi also occurs in Yemen. Its sap contains the deadly cardiotoxic glycoside ouabain. The sap is among the most commonly used in arrow poisons, including those used for poaching elephant.

The poison it contains works by stopping the heart, like most other arrow poisons.
Species
 Acokanthera laevigata Kupicha - Tanzania, Malawi
 Acokanthera oblongifolia (Hochst.) Benth. & Hook.f. ex B.D.Jacks. - Mozambique, South Africa
 Acokanthera oppositifolia (Lam.) Codd - widespread from Cape Province north to Zaire and Tanzania
 Acokanthera rotundata  (Codd) Kupicha - Zimbabwe, Eswatini, eastern South Africa
 Acokanthera schimperi (A.DC.) Schweinf. - Yemen, Eritrea, Djibouti, Ethiopia, Somalia, Socotra, Kenya, Tanzania, Rwanda, Zaire

References

 
Apocynaceae genera
Flora of Africa
Poisonous plants